Tim Owens (born 1945) is a former Republican member of the Kansas Senate, representing the 8th district from 2008 to 2013.  He was a representative for the 19th district in the Kansas House of Representatives from 2002 until his election as senator.  From 1981 to 2005, he served as a council member for the Overland Park City Council, 3rd District.  An attorney, he is married with 2 children.

Disagreement with Conservative Republicans
Senator Owens made national news as a leading liberal-Republican in the Kansas Senate, blocking the state's Health Care Freedom Amendment, an effort to push back parts of the Affordable Care Act. He also argued that judges should be selected by a committee of lawyers rather than the governor. As a consequence of their independence, Owens and seven other moderates were targeted for primary defeats by Koch Industries. He and five others were defeated. Owens and five others were defeated, though two years later, the public voted replacements down. In 2018, Owens was the campaign treasurer for Kansas independent candidate Greg Orman, but he stepped down on October 30, after conceding that only moderate democrat Laura Kelly could beat anti-immigrant Republican Kris Kobach.

Committee assignments
Owens served on these Senate legislative committees:
 Judiciary (chair)
 Confirmation Oversight
 Joint Committee on Corrections and Juvenile Justice Oversight
 Education
 Federal and State Affairs
 Joint Committee on Kansas Security

Major Donors
Some of the top contributors to Owens's 2008 campaign, according to the National Institute on Money in State Politics:
 Kansas Republican Senatorial Committee, Hallmark Cards, Kansas Contractors Association, Kansas Association of Realtors, Kansas Medical Society, and others

Finance, insurance, and real estate companies were his largest donor group.

Elections

2008
Running for an open senate seat, Owens defeated fellow House member Benjamin Hodge in the Republican primary and Democrat Judy Macy in the general election.

2012
In the 2012 Republican primary, Owens lost to former Johnson county Sheriff, Jim Denning, who won the general election.

References

External links
Kansas Senate 2011-2012
Project Vote Smart profile
 Campaign Contributions: 2000, 2002, 2004, 2006, 2008
 Owens's website
 Ballotpedia

Republican Party Kansas state senators
Republican Party members of the Kansas House of Representatives
21st-century American politicians
Kansas lawyers
Living people
1945 births
Kansas city council members